Penang is a state in Malaysia.

Penang may also refer to:

Places
 Penang Island
 Penang International Airport
 Penang Bridge

Others
 Penang FA, a football club based in George Town, Penang, Malaysia
 Penang (restaurant chain)
 Penang Hokkien, a dialect of Hokkien spoken in the district of Penang, Malaysia
 Phanaeng, a type of red Thai curry

See also
 Penan, aboriginal people in Brunei